Derwin Lamar Montgomery (born September 3, 1988) is a former Democratic member of the North Carolina House of Representatives, who represented the 72nd district (containing parts of Forsyth County) from 2018 until 2021.

Political career
Montgomery served on the Winston-Salem City Council from 2009 through 2018. Montgomery was appointed to complete the unexpired term of Rep. Ed Hanes for the 72nd district in the North Carolina House of Representatives in August 2018. He went on to win the election for a full two-year term on 6 November 2018 as the nominee of the Democratic Party. He secured seventy-nine percent of the vote while his closest rival, Republican Reginald Reid, secured twenty-one percent.

In 2020, Montgomery ran for the U.S. House of Representatives in the 6th congressional district, but lost the Democratic primary to Kathy Manning.

Electoral history

2020

2018

References

External links

Living people
1988 births
People from Winston-Salem, North Carolina
Politicians from Winston-Salem, North Carolina
21st-century American politicians
North Carolina city council members
Democratic Party members of the North Carolina House of Representatives